Elia Frosio (22 January 1913 – 4 February 2005) was a professional cyclist from Italy. He started his career in the 1930s as a road racer. After World War II, he changed to motor-paced racing and won every national championship between 1946 and 1950, as well as the world championships in 1946 and 1949.

References

1913 births
2005 deaths
Italian male cyclists
Cyclists from the Province of Bergamo
UCI Track Cycling World Champions (men)
Italian track cyclists